The Canton of Hallencourt  is a former canton situated in the department of the Somme and the Picardie region of northern France. It was disbanded following the French canton reorganisation which came into effect in March 2015. It consisted of 16 communes, which joined the canton of Gamaches in 2015. It had 7,849 inhabitants (2012).

Geography 
The canton is organised around the commune of Hallencourt in the arrondissement of Abbeville. The altitude varies from 6 m at Érondelle to 127 m at Allery for an average of 59 m.

The canton comprised 16 communes:

Allery
Bailleul
Citerne
Doudelainville
Érondelle
Fontaine-sur-Somme
Frucourt
Hallencourt
Huppy
Liercourt
Limeux
Longpré-les-Corps-Saints
Mérélessart
Sorel-en-Vimeu
Vaux-Marquenneville
Wiry-au-Mont

Population

See also
 Arrondissements of the Somme department
 Cantons of the Somme department
 Communes of the Somme department

References

Hallencourt
2015 disestablishments in France
States and territories disestablished in 2015